Paramount Networks UK & Australia (formerly ViacomCBS Networks UK & Australia) is a subsidiary of Paramount Global. The unit launched in 2020 and is based in London, United Kingdom, with a local office in Sydney, Australia.

Units

See also 
 Pluto TV 
 Nickelodeon 
 Noggin

References

External links
 Paramount Networks Australia & New Zealand

British subsidiaries of foreign companies
Australian subsidiaries of foreign companies
UK and Australia
Mass media companies established in 2020
Mass media companies based in London